Kopanovka is a rural locality (a selo) in Yenotayevsky District, Astrakhan Oblast, Russia. The population was 1,052 as of 2010. There are 18 streets.

Geography 
Kopanovka is located 34 km northwest of Yenotayevka (the district's administrative centre) by road. Mikhaylovka is the nearest rural locality.

References 

Rural localities in Yenotayevsky District